Damien Dovy (born 31 March 1966 in Vitry-sur-Seine, France) is a French karateka who  won multiple medals at Karate's top Competitions the European Karate Championships and World Karate Championships. 
Also lost with the Algerian/swedish Amin Boubeker in 1996 in swedish open in Stockholm ,
Although born in France Dovy also represented Benin the country of his heritage at international level.

 2002 World Karate Championships, Gold medalist at men's kumite − 60 kg
 2000 World Karate Championships, Bronze medalist at men's kumite − 60 kg
 1997 European Karate Championships, Silver medalist at men's kumite − 60 kg
 1996 European Karate Championships, Gold medalist at men's kumite − 60 kg
 1995 European Karate Championships, Gold medalist at men's kumite − 60 kg
 1994 World Karate Championships, Gold medalist at men's kumite − 60 kg
 1994 European Karate Championships, Bronze medalist at men's kumite − 60 kg
 1993 European Karrate Championships, Bronze medalist at men's kumite − 60 kg
 1992 European Karate Championships, Gold medalist at men's kumite − 60 kg
 1992 World Karate Championships, Bronze medalist at men's kumite − 60 kg
 1989 European Karate Championships, Gold medalist at men's kumite − 60 kg
 1988 European Karate Championships, Bronze medalist at men's kumite − 60 kg

References

External links
 

1966 births
Living people
French male karateka
French sportspeople of Beninese descent
People from Vitry-sur-Seine
World Games bronze medalists
Competitors at the 1993 World Games
Sportspeople from Val-de-Marne
World Games medalists in karate
20th-century French people